Natalie Taylor is an American singer-songwriter. She is known for her emotionally-driven songs that have soundtracked many television shows, commercials, and viral videos.

Career
In 2014, Taylor’s song "Love Life" was featured in a BareMinerals commercial. 

In 2015, her song "I Want It All" was featured in the documentary The True Cost. Taylor released the single "Surrender" in 2015. The song became a sleeper hit in 2020 after receiving virality. The song was certified Platinum in the US and Canada. "Surrender" also spent time on radio's Hot AC Top 30. 

In 2020, her version of the Steppenwolf song "Born to Be Wild" featured in an advertisement for Volvo cars. 

In 2021, Taylor released an EP titled Covers, Vol. 1 including various covers of hers as heard in television shows such as Grey's Anatomy, Lucifer and World of Dance.

In 2021, Taylor appeared on the track "Fragments" with American DJ Illenium which was featured on his fourth album, "Fallen Embers". "Fallen Embers" was nominated for a Grammy Award in 2022 for Best Dance/Electronic Album.

Discography

Extended plays

Singles

References

External links
 Official site

Living people
American singer-songwriters
21st-century American singers
21st-century American women singers
1986 births